Hysterocladia mirabilis is a moth of the Megalopygidae family. It was described by Schaus in 1905. It is found in Colombia.

The body is white, the front is black, the antennae and vertex bright red and the mid- and fore-legs are brown. The anal hairs are black. The wings are white, the costal margin of the forewings black.

References

Moths described in 1905
Megalopygidae